was a Japanese daimyō in Hizen Province during the Sengoku period. 
Takanobu was the head of the Ryūzōji clan.

Biography
Takanobu was the grandson of Ryūzōji Iekane (1454-1546).

Ryūzōji Takanobu is known for expanding his clan's holdings. He took land from the Shōni clan. In 1578, Takanobu conquered almost all of Hizen Province. The following year, the Ryūzōji clan advanced to Chikuzen and Buzen. In 1580, Takanobu retired in Suko castle but he retained the real power until his death.

In 1584, Ryūzōji retainer Arima Harunobu split from the clan. Seizing upon this opportunity, several of the local small clans in the Shimabara Peninsula also rose up in arms. 
Takanobu personally led an army of around 30,000 against the Shimazu-Arima, but was killed in the Battle of Okitanawate by Shimazu Iehisa's army.

Ryūzōji Masaie (1556–1607) was the son of Takanobu. Following Takanobu's death, Ryūzōji clan was taken over by Takanobu's chief retainer Nabeshima Naoshige.

References

Further reading 

Daimyo
1530 births
1584 deaths
Deified Japanese people
Japanese warriors killed in battle
Ryūzōji clan